Cobham & Stoke d'Abernon railway station is in the village of Stoke d'Abernon in Surrey, England and also serves the nearby town of Cobham.

The station, and all trains serving it, are operated by South Western Railway.  It is on the New Guildford Line, and is served by trains between Waterloo and Guildford.

History
The station opened in 1885.

Services
All services at Cobham & Stoke d'Abernon are operated by South Western Railway using  EMUs.

The typical off-peak service in trains per hour is:
 2 tph to  via 
 2 tph to 

On Sundays, the service is reduced to hourly in each direction.

References

External links

Railway stations in Surrey
Former London and South Western Railway stations
Railway stations in Great Britain opened in 1885
Railway stations served by South Western Railway
Borough of Elmbridge